Ko Young-min (Hangul: 고영민, Hanja: 高永民) (born February 8, 1984) is a retired South Korean second baseman who played for the Doosan Bears in the Korea Baseball Organization between 2002 and 2016. He batted and threw right-handed.

Professional career

Upon graduation from Seongnam High School, Ko was drafted by the Doosan Bears in the second round (17th overall) of the 2002 KBO Draft. He had several mediocre season, spending most of his time in the reserve team of the Bears.

In 2006, Ko became a fixture in second base for the Bears as veteran second baseman Ahn Kyung-hyun moved to first base due to deteriorating health. Ko batted a career-high .270 with 85 hits, 29 RBIs, a career-high 5 triples, and 14 stolen bases, appearing 116 games as a starting second baseman.

In 2007, Ko batted .268, compiling a career-high 12 home runs, 119 hits and 66 RBIs while appearing all 126 regular-season games. He led the KBO league in runs (89), and 3rd in stolen bases (36). After the season, he won his first Golden Glove Award at second base.

In 2008, Ko batted .267 with a career-high 70 RBIs, 114 hits, 84 runs, 39 stolen bases and 9 home runs. He led the KBO league in walks (74), and ranked 3rd in runs, 4th in stolen bases and 13th in RBI.

In August 2008, Ko competed for the South Korea national baseball team in the 2008 Summer Olympics, where they won the gold medal in the baseball tournament. Ko's big hit in the Olympics was a three-run homer off of Yang Chien-fu in the 8-7 Korean win over Chinese Taipei.

Prior to the 2009 KBO season, Ko participated in the 2009 World Baseball Classic in March 2009. In the WBC, he batted .308 with 4 hit in 13 at-bats, sharing the starting second base position with Jeong Keun-Woo. In Round 2, Ko smacked a solo home run off New York Mets starter Óliver Pérez in the bottom of the 5th inning to lead his team to an 8-2 victory over Mexico.

Career stats

Bold = led KBO

Notable international careers

External links
 Profile and stats at the KBO official website 

1984 births
Living people
Members of Sōka Gakkai
South Korean Buddhists
2009 World Baseball Classic players
Baseball players at the 2008 Summer Olympics
Olympic gold medalists for South Korea
Olympic baseball players of South Korea
Doosan Bears players
KBO League second basemen
South Korean baseball players
Olympic medalists in baseball
Medalists at the 2008 Summer Olympics
KT Wiz coaches
Doosan Bears coaches